HSwMS Najad is the lead ship of her class of submarine for the Swedish Navy, project name A14. She was launched at the Kockums shipyard in Malmö, Sweden, on 13 August 1979, and completed and commissioned into the Swedish Navy in 26 June 1981.

Gallery

References 

Draken-class submarines
Ships built in Malmö
1979 ships